Tales of a Traveller, by Geoffrey Crayon, Gent. (1824) is a two-volume collection of essays and short stories composed by Washington Irving while he was living in Europe, primarily in Germany and Paris. The collection was published under Irving's pseudonym, Geoffrey Crayon, Gent.

Contents
VOLUME I

After the introductory "To the Reader", Tales of a Traveller is composed of four "Parts."

Part I: Strange Stories by a Nervous Gentleman
"The Great Unknown"
"The Hunting Dinner"
"The Adventure of My Uncle"
"The Adventure of My Aunt"
"The Bold Dragoon; or, the Adventure of My Grandfather"
"The Adventure of the German Student"
"The Adventure of the Mysterious Picture"
"The Adventure of the Mysterious Stranger"
"The Story of the Young Italian"

Part II: Buckthorne and His Friends
"Literary Life"
"A Literary Dinner"
"The Club of Queer Fellows"
"The Poor-Devil Author"
"Notoriety"
"A Practical Philosopher"
"Buckthorne; or, the Young Man of Great Expectations"

VOLUME II

"Grave Reflections of a Disappointed Man"
"The Booby Squire"
"The Strolling Manager"

Part III: The Italian Banditti
"The Inn at Terracina"
"The Adventure of the Little Antiquary"
"The Belated Travellers"
"The Adventure of the Popkins Family"
"The Painter's Adventure"
"The Story of the Bandit Chieftain"
"The Story of the Young Robber"
"The Adventure of the Englishman"

Part IV: The Money Diggers
"Hell-Gate"
"Kidd the Pirate"
"The Devil and Tom Walker"
"Wolfert Webber, or Golden Dreams"
"The Adventure of the Black Fisherman"

External links 

 

1824 short story collections
Short story collections by Washington Irving
Pirate books
Treasure Island
Works published under a pseudonym